Strobilomyces glabriceps is a species of bolete fungus in the family Suillaceae found in China. It was described as new to science in 1948 by Wei-Fan Chiu. The type collection was made in Kunming in June, 1938.

Description
The surface is initially smooth, but becomes cracked as the bolete ages. Spores are spherical or nearly so, and measure 9–11 µm.

References

External links

Boletaceae
Fungi of China
Fungi described in 1948